The Norwich Built-up Area is an urban area which extends from the city of Norwich to Taverham, Horsham St Faith and Cringleford in Norfolk, England. The area takes in the district of the City of Norwich, and parts of Broadland and South Norfolk districts. The area was recorded at having a population of 213,166.

According to the 2011 census, the gender makeup of the population was 104,611 male and 108,555 female. The ethnic makeup of the whole urban area was 93% white and 3% Asian. Other ethnic minorities were around 4%. The religious make up of the whole area was:

References

Norwich
Norfolk
Geography of Norfolk
Urban areas of England